James Greenhalgh (born 19 February 1975) is a former professional tennis player from New Zealand.

Career
Greenhalgh, a doubles specialist, was born in England, but at the age of four moved to New Zealand. In his junior career he partnered countryman Steven Downs and the pair were boys' doubles champion at the 1993 French Open and 1993 Wimbledon Championships. They defeated South Africans Neville Godwin and Gareth Williams in both finals.

In 1999, Greenhalgh, with partner Grant Silcock, won the Hong Kong Open. They defeated the experienced pairing of Mark Knowles and Daniel Nestor in the semi final and won the final in a walkover, after one of their opponents, Andre Agassi, withdrew with a shoulder injury. It would be his only title win on the ATP Tour and meant that he broke into the double's top 100 rankings for the first time. As a singles player, his highest ever ranking was 327, attained in 1995.

Greenhalgh also made two Grand Slam appearances with Silcock, at the French Open and Wimbledon in 1999, failing to progress past the first round in either. His only other Grand Slam match came in the 2000 Australian Open, where he teamed up with German Michael Kohlmann.

He regularly represented the New Zealand Davis Cup team during his career, participating in a total of 15 ties. In singles he had only a 2–9 record, but won 11 of his 13 doubles rubbers, which is a national record. His six doubles wins with Brett Steven makes them the most successful ever pairing for New Zealand in the Davis Cup.

Junior Grand Slam finals

Doubles: 2 (2 titles)

ATP career finals

Doubles: 1 (1 title)

ATP Challenger and ITF Futures finals

Doubles: 6 (3–3)

References

External links
 
 

1975 births
Living people
New Zealand male tennis players
Wimbledon junior champions
French Open junior champions
English emigrants to New Zealand
People educated at Saint Kentigern College
Grand Slam (tennis) champions in boys' doubles
Tennis people from Hertfordshire